Free Willy 2: The Adventure Home (also known as Free Willy 2) is a 1995 American family adventure drama film and the sequel to the 1993 film Free Willy as well as the second installment in the Free Willy film series distributed by Warner Bros. under their Warner Bros. Family Entertainment label. It is directed by Dwight Little from a screenplay by Karen Janszen, Corey Blechman and John Mattson. Jason James Richter, Jayne Atkinson, August Schellenberg, Mykelti Williamson and Michael Madsen reprise their roles from the first film. New cast members include Jon Tenney and Elizabeth Peña. Unlike the previous film where Keiko played Willy, a robotic double created by Edge Innovations was used to play the eponymous whale while the Free Willy Keiko Foundation devised a plan to bring Keiko to the Oregon Coast Aquarium where he would be rehabilitated from poor health.

Filming commenced in Astoria, Oregon and the San Juan Islands between April and August 1994 with additional filming taking place in California.

The film opened to mixed reviews from critics. Despite underperforming at the box office, a third film Free Willy 3: The Rescue was subsequently released in 1997.

Plot 
The Greenwoods are heading to the San Juan Islands to visit Randolph while camping at Camp Nor'wester. Before they leave, Dwight stops by with tragic news regarding Jesse's mother who, sadly, was found dead in New York City and left behind another son. Jesse is devastated and angry after many attempts at finding her, but comes to terms after talking his feelings out with Glen. When Jesse's half-brother Elvis arrives, he is morose, overly talkative and mischievous, and he is also prone to telling lies and easily gets on Jesse's nerves. He is invited, so that the boys can get to know each other. At the environmental institute, Jesse reunites with Randolph, quickly becomes smitten with his goddaughter, Nadine, and is introduced to Willy's family. He tracks and later reunites with Willy that night.

As the Greenwoods continue to enjoy their trip, the Dakar runs aground on Lawson Reef and spills oil due to an engine malfunction, trapping Willy, Littlespot and Luna, whose dying from the oil in her lungs having swum through it, at the campsite. Benbrook Oil CEO John Milner arrives and announces a plan to move the whales into captivity until further notice. Jesse challenges this, making him promise to do whatever he can to get them safely back to their mom Catspaw or else he'll be blamed for Luna's death, to which John seemingly agrees. Luna's condition worsens the day after Kate Haley treated her, but Randolph and Jesse eventually use an old Indian remedy that helped Luna recover.

With the oil spill reaching dangerous proximity to the cove, Benbrook Oil and the whalers boom it off despite Jesse, Randolph and Nadine's objections and begin extracting the whales. Elvis, who ran away yesterday after Annie broke a promise in allowing him to get involve more, was at a donut shop where he overheard John and whaler Bill Wilcox's real plan to sell the whales, and rushes back to camp in time to warn Jesse. They and Nadine confront John which led to him and his assistant getting knocked into the water for breaking his promise to Jesse. Willy manages to rescue Littlespot from the extraction. With time running out before the oil reaches the cove, Jesse hijacks the Little Dipper to lead the whales to safety. On Jesse's signal, Willy is able to break the boom and leads Luna and Littlespot, but the Dakar explodes due to fuel vapors igniting after engineers tried to start the generator, resulting in crude oil to catch fire. Fortunately, the whales were able to swim under the flaming oil.

Randolph picks up Glen and Annie, who just spotted Elvis after spending all night last night searching for him, as he sends a distress call. The kids fall into danger when they head into another cove, but the fogginess from the smoke caused Jesse to hit a rock and Little Dipper begins to sink while the flames seal off the cove. A search and rescue helicopter locates them, and Elvis and Nadine are pulled to safety. However, before the helicopter can rescue Jesse, the Little Dipper then submerges completely, leaving him struggling in the oily water, and unable to secure himself sufficiently into the harness. Jesse slips out of the harness, into the water, only inches away from the helicopter, and due to smoke choking the engine, it is forced to leave him behind. Jesse nearly drowns, but Willy returns for his friend and is able to carry him safely under the fire in time for the adults to retrieve Jesse. Though Jesse was curious as to why Willy won't leave, Randolph reveals the signal must be performed. Jesse does it, and he, Glen and Annie say goodbye to Willy.

The group is together again shortly after the Coastal Marine Patrol delivers Elvis and Nadine. Elvis gives Jesse a picture of Jesse and their mother that was taped back together and also tells Jesse that she talked about him, and felt bad about everything. Glen approves Annie's proposal of adopting Elvis. When asked by Elvis about his knowledge of the whales' whereabouts, Jesse tells him he knows.

Sometime later, Willy, Luna and Littlespot reunite with Catspaw.

Cast 
 Jason James Richter as Jesse
 Francis Capra as Elvis
 Mary Kate Schellhardt as Nadine
 August Schellenberg as Randolph Johnson
 Michael Madsen as Glen Greenwood (credited as "Glenn")
 Jayne Atkinson as Annie Greenwood
 Mykelti Williamson as Dwight Mercer
 Elizabeth Peña as Dr. Kate Haley
 Jon Tenney as John Milner
 Paul Tuerpe as Milner's assistant
 M. Emmet Walsh as Bill Wilcox (credited as "Wilcox")
 John Considine as Commander Blake
 Steve Kahan as Captain Nilson
 Neal Matarazzo as Helmsman Kelly
 Al Sapienza as Engineer
 Basil Wallace as Reporter
 Marguerite Moreau as Julie
 Scott Stuber as Policeman
 Joan Lunden as herself

Production
In November 1993, it was announced that producer Lauren Shuler Donner and her husband and co-executive producer Richard Donner were pursuing active development of a sequel to Free Willy following the breakout success of the first film, however unlike the first film the whale would be fully animatronic. Jason James Richter was announced to reprise his role as Jesse after renogtiatiating the original sequel option from the first film from $150,000 to $1.5 million with an option for a third sequel.

Reception 
Free Willy 2 grossed $30 million in the United States and Canada and $68 million worldwide on a $31 million budget. It received mixed reviews from critics, though many were impressed with the film's subtle approach to pollution and other environmental issues, while focusing on family values.

 Audiences polled by CinemaScore gave the film an average grade of "A-" on an A+ to F scale.

Accolades 
The movie was nominated for Worst Sequel and The Sequel Nobody Was Clamoring For at the 1995 Stinkers Bad Movie Awards, but lost to Ace Ventura: When Nature Calls and Halloween 6: The Curse of Michael Myers, respectively. Willy won Favorite Animal Star at the 1996 Kids' Choice Awards.

Soundtrack 

Released through MJJ Music in association with 550 Music and Epic Soundtrax in 1995, the soundtrack contained most of the songs from the film plus two additional tracks from Brownstone, whose song "Sometimes Dancin'" first appeared on their debut album From the Bottom Up, and 3T. The only song not included is "My Spirit Calls Out" that Randolph performed when he treated Luna.

Basil Poledouris returned to compose new music and also incorporated several scoring elements from the previous film.

Michael Jackson continued his affiliation with the Free Willy franchise when "Childhood", a double A-side single for "Scream" from HIStory: Past, Present and Future, Book I, served as the main theme around Elvis while the instrumental version is played when he looks at a photo of the Greenwoods with Jesse.

An instrumental version of Nathan Cavaleri's song "Lou's Blues" was used to dub Jesse's offscreen guitar playing.

Two renditions of Bob Dylan's "Forever Young" are featured in the movie. While a version from Michael Jackson's sister Rebbie was heard inside the donut shop Elvis and Wilcox attended, the end credits used The Pretenders' version the band previously recorded for the film With Honors and was also included on their album Last of the Independents.

Track listing

Title 
On early UK home video promotions, the movie was titled simply "Willy 2: The Adventure Home", presumably because the film's premise, unlike its predecessor's, does not involve Willy being freed.

References

External links 
 

1995 films
1995 children's films
1990s children's films
1990s disaster films
American children's films
American disaster films
American sequel films
Fictional orcas
Works about petroleum
Films about orphans
Films about children
Films about dolphins
Films about whales
Films about animals
Films about brothers
Films about animal rights
Films about friendship
Films about families
Films about siblings
Films about adoption
Films about seafaring accidents or incidents
Films about marine biology
Films about camping
Films about vacationing
Films about Native Americans
Films directed by Dwight H. Little
Films produced by Lauren Shuler Donner
Films scored by Basil Poledouris
Films set on ships
Films set in Washington (state)
Films shot in Washington (state)
Films shot in Los Angeles
Films shot in California
Films set in Astoria, Oregon
Films shot in Astoria, Oregon
Films shot in Oregon
Films set in Oregon
Films set in the United States
Films shot in the United States
Environmental films
Films with underwater settings
Films featuring underwater diving
Puppet films
Regency Enterprises films
StudioCanal films
Warner Bros. films
Free Willy (franchise)
1990s English-language films
1990s American films